Pokémon Stadium, known in Japan as  is a strategy video game developed and published by Nintendo for the Nintendo 64. First released in Japan on April 30, 1999, it was later released as the first Stadium title in Western regions the following year, and is a sequel to the Japanese-only 1998 Nintendo 64 release Pocket Monsters’ Stadium. The gameplay revolves around a 3D turn-based battling system using the 151 Pokémon from the Game Boy games Pokémon Red, Pokémon Blue, and Pokémon Yellow.

Originally intended for the Nintendo 64DD, it was later developed into a standard console game after the add-on failed. Using the Transfer Pak accessory that was bundled with the game, players are able to view, organize, store, trade, and battle their own Pokémon uploaded from Pokémon Red, Pokémon Blue, and Pokémon Yellow. The game includes four stadium cups, each of which is a series of three-on-three Pokémon battles against an ordered lineup of opponents. Gym Leader Castle mode involves battles against the eight Kanto gym leaders and the Elite Four. Pokémon Stadium also features mini-games, versus-style battles, a hall of fame, compatibility with the Game Boy Printer, and a built-in emulation function for Pokémon Red, Pokémon Blue, and Pokémon Yellow.

Pokémon Stadium became one of the best-selling Nintendo 64 titles, selling one million copies before the end of 2000. Critical reception was mixed, with critics praising the game's visuals but finding fault with the audio quality. A sequel, Pokémon Stadium 2, released in 2000 as a counterpart for the next-generation Pokémon Gold, Pokémon Silver, and Pokémon Crystal games. The game is set to be re-released on the Nintendo Switch Online + Expansion Pack in 2023.

Gameplay

Unlike the Game Boy games Pokémon Red, Blue, and Yellow, Pokémon Stadium does not have a storyline or a well-defined world, meaning that it is not considered a role-playing video game. Instead the game challenges the player to succeed in trainer battles at the Stadium, a tournament consisting of 4 "Cups" and 80 battles in total, as well as the Gym Leader Castle, where the player battles the 8 Kanto Gym Leaders, the Kanto Elite Four, and the Champion. When all Cups have been won and the Gym Leader Castle is completed, a six-on-one battle against Mewtwo is unlocked. Defeating Mewtwo unlocks another round of Stadium, Gym Leader Castle, and the Mewtwo battle, but with higher AI difficulty.

In Stadium mode, the player is challenged to earn trophies by winning the Pika Cup, Petit Cup, Poké Cup, and Prime Cup, each having its own set of rules and restrictions. In the Poké and Prime Cups, four trophies may be earned, one for each level of difficulty. The Pika and Petit Cups only award one trophy each. After choosing a Cup to compete in, the player decides on a party of six Pokémon, which may include available rental Pokémon and/or Pokémon imported from a Game Boy cartridge of Pokémon Red, Blue, or Yellow. In each battle, the player and the opponent are only allowed to use three of their six party Pokémon. The player will win a trophy after successfully completing all battles in a Cup. If certain conditions are met using imported Pokémon from a Game Boy cartridge, the player will be awarded a Pikachu with the move Surf, which unlocks a mini-game in Pokémon Yellow.

In the Gym Leader Castle, the player initially challenges the eight Kanto Gym Leaders from the Game Boy games, followed by the Elite Four, and finally the Champion. Before battling a Gym Leader, however, the player must defeat a gym's three Pokémon trainers. Like in the Stadium, the player has to pick a team of six Pokémon and may only use three at a time for battling. Each time the player defeats the Elite Four, one of eight randomly selected prize Pokémon will be awarded, which can be transferred to the player's Pokémon Red, Blue, or Yellow game using the Transfer Pak. The prize Pokémon are Bulbasaur, Charmander, Squirtle, Hitmonlee, Hitmonchan, Eevee, Kabuto, and Omanyte.

Other features

Aside from Stadium and Gym Leader Castle modes, Pokémon Stadium also features mini-games, a Game Boy Tower (a mode for playing Red, Blue, and Yellow on the console via emulation), the Victory Palace (a showcase of Pokémon that have been present in the player's team once achieving victory), Oak's Lab (featuring connectivity to the Game Boy titles including a Pokédex), Free Battle (a battle between two players with set rules), Battle Now (a battle with pre-determined teams), and Gallery.

Pokémon Stadium is compatible with Pokémon Game Boy game cartridges via the Transfer Pak, which allows players to use Pokémon stored on Red, Blue, and Yellow Game Boy cartridges in Stadiums battle modes. A player's Game Boy Pokémon can also be saved, researched, and traded on the Nintendo 64 in Oak's Lab. This mode allows players to study each Pokémon's behavior and attacks.

Mini-games
Nine mini-games are included in Pokémon Stadium, located under Kids Club, and each game allows up to four players. If any of the four player slots are not taken, the CPU takes over the excess slots.
 "Clefairy Says": Played similarly to the game Simon Says, players must use the Control Pad to repeat back the directions that the instructor Clefairy writes on the blackboard. To win, players must be the last one standing or have the fewest misses after five rounds.
 "Dig! Dig! Dig!": Players race to see which Sandshrew can dig for water the fastest.
 "Ekans' Hoop Hurl": Players toss several Ekans over the Diglett that pop out of the holes. Each successful toss gives the player points.
 "Magikarp's Splash": As Magikarp, players must use the Splash move to make it hit the counter above them. The players with the most points win.
 "Rock Harden": As either Metapod or Kakuna, players must use the move Harden to stop boulders from damaging them while taking care not to waste their Pokémon's stamina.
 "Run, Rattata, Run": As Rattata, players run on a treadmill to be the first to reach the goal, jumping over hurdles along the way.
 "Snore War": As Drowzee, players must use the move Hypnosis on a pendulum when it hits the center of the swing to make the other Drowzee fall asleep.
 "Sushi Go-Round": Using Lickitung, players must eat as much sushi as they can while avoiding spicier foods and the tea, both of which make the player lose control of their Lickitung. The player with the most expensive bill wins.
 "Thundering Dynamo"''': As either Pikachu or Voltorb, players must rapidly press the A or B button depending on the light bulb color to charge electricity.

Development
 Pocket Monsters Stadium

The first Pocket Monsters' Stadium was released only in Japan on August 1, 1998. Once intended as a Nintendo 64DD launch title with a March 1998 release date, it was instead converted to a standard Nintendo 64 game on a 32MB cartridge. Because of technical limitations, this version features only 40 Pokémon that are available for battle, instead of the full 151 Pokémon from the Game Boy versions as originally planned. The remaining Pokémon can be viewed in a Pokémon encyclopedia called the Pokédex, but the models lack the required animations for battle. Connectivity with the Pokémon Game Boy trilogy is available using the Transfer Pak. HAL Laboratory president Satoru Iwata, who would later head Nintendo itself, was the one who managed to port the battle system to work in the Nintendo 64, taking a whole week to read the entire Game Boy source code, and afterwards convert Shigeki Morimoto's programming from the Pokémon games. The game sold a reported 270,000 copies in its first month of release. This version was not released outside Japan, and as such the numbering of the subsequent Pocket Monsters Stadium games is ahead of the Pokémon Stadium releases.

Release

International release
On February 16, 1999, Nintendo announced that it would be showing Pokémon Stadium 2 in a Japan-exclusive event called Pokémon Festival '99. Early reviews of the game from Japan's Weekly Famitsu Crew were favorable. Because the first game had met criticism for its difficulty, the AI was toned down for the sequel to make it easier for average players. Released as Pokémon Stadium throughout North America and Europe, this version supports the transfer of all first generation Pokémon to and from Pokémon Red, Blue, and Yellow via the N64 Transfer Pak.

Promotion
Nintendo released a very limited edition bundle in North America that included a copy of Pokémon Stadium, a Nintendo 64 console, one Gray and one Atomic Purple Nintendo 64 controller, a poster, a Pokémon Trainer's Journal, and an exclusive holographic rare Cool Porygon promo card by Wizards of the Coast for the trading card game.

In celebration of the game's North American release, Nintendo and Blockbuster LLC partnered for a promotion in which the first Pokémon Stadium game cartridges delivered to Blockbuster contained a coupon for a limited edition Pokémon Stadium master team sticker poster and a free Pokémon Smart Card, which could be used to redeem up to 16 stickers at Blockbuster locations. The Smart Cards were previously available in Blockbuster's 1999 promotion for Pokémon Snap.

ReceptionPokémon Stadium received mixed reviews from critics. GameSpot contributor Jeff Gerstmann gave the game a 5.7 "mediocre" review, writing that the gameplay "feels scaled down and oversimplified, even when compared with the original Game Boy games". IGN's Peer Schneider wrote an 8.2 "great" review of the game, calling it "a must-buy for Pokémon fans", but also citing that "the audio is nowhere near the quality of some of the recent Nintendo releases". Regarding the game's announcer, a frequent complaint among critics, RPGamer's Ben Martin wrote that: "With a very limited vocabulary and continual comments thoughout [sic] every single action, it certainly is a nice option to be able to turn this guy off". In his review on gaming website Cubed3, Ross Morley praised the game's battle system for its "beautiful 3D models, special effects and range of options".

In its first month of sales in North America, Pokémon Stadium sold over one million copies, and it became the best-selling console game in the region during the year 2000. Nintendo of America announced that it would be released as a Player's Choice title, a well-selling game with a lower suggested retail price, on December 26, 2000. At least more than 3.97 million copies have been sold, including 3.16 million in the United States, 710,765 in Japan, and more than 100,000 in the United Kingdom.

Sequel and legacy

Months after its debut, a follow-up to Pokémon Stadium, tentatively titled Pokémon Stadium Gold/Silver, was announced by Nintendo. The game was released in 2000 and 2001 as Pokémon Stadium 2, featuring the 251 Pokémon from the first two generations. Transfer Pak compatibility was included for Pokémon Gold, Silver, and Crystal—as well as Pokémon Red, Blue, and Yellow.

The Super Smash Bros. series has featured a "Pokémon Stadium" stage in multiple entries, beginning with Super Smash Bros. Melee''.

Notes

References

External links
 Pokémon Stadium at Pokemon.com
 Pokémon Stadium at Nintendo.com (archive)

1999 video games
Cancelled 64DD games
Nintendo 64 games
Nintendo 64-only games
Nintendo Switch Online games
Party video games
Turn-based strategy video games
Video games developed in Japan
Games with Transfer Pak support
Stadium
Multiplayer and single-player video games
HAL Laboratory games
Video game spin-offs
Video games scored by Toru Minegishi
VSDA Game of the Year winners